Synzymes are substances with catalytic capabilities. The name synzyme is derived from synthetic enzyme. Current synzymes consist mainly of organic molecules tailored in such a way that they catalyse certain kinds of reactions. Like enzymes, they bind a transition state of a substrate in an active site, and like enzymes they generally obey Michaelis-Menten kinetics. 

Derivatised proteins:
If [Ru(NH3)5]3+ is attached to certain histidine residues in a myoglobin protein, myoglobin is no longer a passive oxygen carrier, but gains enzymatic activity of an oxidase. Ascorbic acid is oxidised with molecular oxygen.

Antibodies can act as enzymes, then named abzymes, if they are selected against transition state analogues. Abzymes have a low KM, meaning that they readily bind a target molecule, but have low Vmax values, indicating a slow reaction rate.

Synzymes from organic molecules:
Cyclodextrins are cap structures with a hydrophilic exterior but a hydrophobic interior. If pyridoxal is anchored in the interior the cyclodextran shows transaminase activity.

See also 
 Artificial enzyme
 Catalysis

References

External links 
http://www.lsbu.ac.uk/biology/enztech/artificial.html

Enzymes